Baliji-peta or Baligi-peta is a village in Parvathipuram Manyam district of the Indian state of Andhra Pradesh. According to some historians, most of the people of Original Balija caste have migrated from this village.

Geography
It has an average elevation of .It is 240 ft above sea level at the distance of 103 km from Visakhapatnam.

Demography
Balijipeta mandal has a population of 62,787 in 2001. Males consists of 31,216 and females 31,571 of the population. The average literacy rate is 48% below the national average of 59.5%. Male literacy rate is 59% and that of females 33%.

Assembly constituency
Balijipeta was a Legislative Assembly Constituency of Andhra Pradesh in 1955 and 1962. It was later merged with Vunukuru Constituency. Later has been considered in Parvathipuram Constituency. 

List of Elected Members:
1955 - Peddinti Ramaswamy Naidu. 
1962 - Vasireddy Krishna Murthy Naidu.

References

Villages in Parvathipuram Manyam district